The 2017 Tales of the Turtles 400, was a Monster Energy NASCAR Cup Series race held on September 17, 2017, at Chicagoland Speedway in Joliet, Illinois. Contested over 267 laps on the  intermediate speedway, was the 27th race of the 2017 Monster Energy NASCAR Cup Series season, first race of the Playoffs, and the first race of the Round of 16.

Report

Background

Chicagoland Speedway is a  tri-oval speedway in Joliet, Illinois, southwest of Chicago. The speedway opened in 2001 and currently hosts NASCAR racing including the opening event in the Chase for the Sprint Cup. Until 2011, the speedway also hosted the IndyCar Series, recording numerous close finishes including the closest finish in IndyCar history. The speedway is owned and operated by International Speedway Corporation and located adjacent to Route 66 Raceway.

Entry list

First practice

Qualifying

Qualifying results

Practice (post-qualifying)

Second practice

Final practice

Race

Race results

Stage results

Stage 1
Laps: 80

Stage 2
Laps: 80

Final stage results

Stage 3
Laps: 107

Race statistics
 Lead changes: 7 among different drivers
 Cautions/Laps: 4 for 21
 Red flags: 0
 Time of race: 2 hours, 45 minutes and 16 seconds
 Average speed:

Media

Television
NBC Sports covered the race on the television side. Rick Allen, Jeff Burton and Steve Letarte had the call in the booth for the race. Dave Burns, Parker Kligerman, Marty Snider and Kelli Stavast reported from pit lane during the race.

Radio
The Motor Racing Network had the radio call for the race, which was simulcast on Sirius XM NASCAR Radio.

Standings after the race

Drivers' Championship standings

Manufacturers' Championship standings

Note: Only the first 16 positions are included for the driver standings.

References

Tales of the Turtles 400
Tales of the Turtles 400
NASCAR races at Chicagoland Speedway
Tales of the Turtles 400
Teenage Mutant Ninja Turtles